The 2012 R+L Carriers New Orleans Bowl was a post-season American college football bowl game held on December 22, 2012, at the Mercedes-Benz Superdome in New Orleans, Louisiana. The 12th edition of the New Orleans Bowl began at 11:00 a.m. CST and aired on ESPN. It featured the East Carolina Pirates from Conference USA against the Louisiana–Lafayette Ragin' Cajuns from the Sun Belt Conference and was the final game of the 2012 NCAA Division I FBS football season for both teams. The Ragin' Cajuns accepted their invitation after earning an 8–4 record in the regular season, while the Pirates advanced to the game through the C-USA's contingency plan after earning an 8–4 record.

The 77 combined points scored by both teams set a New Orleans Bowl record.

Teams
Since 2002, the New Orleans Bowl has had its current setup with a team from Conference USA playing a team from the Sun Belt Conference.

This was the eleventh meeting between the two teams. Louisiana–Lafayette leads the all-time record 6-4. The last time they played was in 1990.

East Carolina

The Pirates continued their winning history in Conference USA, becoming the East Division co-champions with a 7-1 conference record (though losing the championship game tiebreaker through their only conference loss to the UCF Knights).  After said Knights lost the Tulsa Golden Hurricane in the 2012 Conference USA Football Championship Game, the conference's corresponding contingency plan for the 2012–13 NCAA Bowl season put the Pirates in the 2012 New Orleans Bowl.

This will be the Pirates' first-ever New Orleans Bowl.

Louisiana–Lafayette

The Ragin' Cajuns are the defending New Orleans Bowl champions, and their road to this year's game is similar to the previous year's.  Although the Sun Belt has a record five bowl-eligible teams this year, the Ragin' Cajuns stood out amidst the competition by compiling a 5-2 conference record, including victories over fellow bowl-eligible teams the Louisiana-Monroe Warhawks and the Western Kentucky Hilltoppers.  After defeating the South Alabama Jaguars to improve their regular-season record to 7-4, the Ragin' Cajuns accepted the fifth invitation of the 2012–13 NCAA Bowl season to the 2012 New Orleans Bowl.

Game summary

Scoring summary

Statistics

References

New Orleans Bowl
New Orleans Bowl
East Carolina Pirates football bowl games
Louisiana Ragin' Cajuns football bowl games
New Orleans Bowl